Artiža Vas is a small village in the Municipality of Ivančna Gorica in central Slovenia. It lies just east of Ivančna Gorica and the A2 motorway runs across the settlement's territory just north of the village core. The area is part of the historical region of Lower Carniola. The municipality is now included in the Central Slovenia Statistical Region.

Name
Artiža Vas was attested in historical sources as Hartwigisdorf in 1190, Hertwigisdorff in 1250, and Erwischendorff in 1505.

Cultural heritage
A small roadside chapel-shrine in the middle of the village dates to the late 19th century.

References

External links

Artiža Vas on Geopedia

Populated places in the Municipality of Ivančna Gorica